A Girl for Me (Swedish: En flicka för mej) is a 1943 Swedish comedy film directed by Börje Larsson and starring Sickan Carlsson, Karl-Arne Holmsten and Max Hansen. It was shot at the Sundbyberg Studios in Stockholm. The film's sets were designed by the art director Max Linder.

Cast

 Sickan Carlsson as Vera Lanner
 Karl-Arne Holmsten as Klas Ekengren
 Max Hansen as 	Ambrosius Jensen
 Gull Natorp as 	Lord Mayoress
 Hilda Borgström as Aunt Louise
 Kerstin Lindahl as 	Marianne
 Eric Gustafson as 	Hedlund
 Bror Bügler as 	Halmblad
 Marianne Löfgren as 	Journalist
 Julia Cæsar as 	Mrs. Nilsson
 Artur Rolén as 	Mr. Nilsson 
 Willy Peters as 	Klas' Friend
 Åke Engfeldt as 	Klas' Friend
 Åke Jensen as 	Klas' Friend
 Magnus Kesster as 	Barber
 Ragnar Widestedt as 	Major Blom
 Carl Deurell as 	Elder
 Torsten Hillberg as Elder
 Nina Scenna as Therese Hedlund
 Ruth Weijden as Emma
 Stina Ståhle as Mrs. Hedlund
 Wiola Brunius as Gertrud Vesterberg 
 Margit Andelius as 	Mrs. Johansson
 Hartwig Fock as Taxi Driver
 Nils Ohlin as 	A Man
 Nils Jacobsson as A Man
 Bertil Berglund as 	Janitor 
 Gösta Bodin as 	Cafe owner 
 Ernst Brunman as 	Policeman 
 Gösta Gustafson as Brinck
 Agneta Lagerfeldt as 	Woman 
 Paul Hagman as Man in the audience 
 Arne Lindblad as 	Maitre d'
 Ingrid Luterkort as 	Klas' secretary

References

Bibliography 
 Qvist, Per Olov & von Bagh, Peter. Guide to the Cinema of Sweden and Finland. Greenwood Publishing Group, 2000.

External links 
 

1943 films
Swedish comedy films
1943 comedy films
1940s Swedish-language films
Films directed by Börje Larsson
1940s Swedish films